John Bremer (1927–2015) was an educator and Socratic philosopher. In 2008 he retired as a senior scholar teaching at Cambridge College in Cambridge, Massachusetts where he was Professor of Humanities and Director of the college's Humanities and Freedom Institute. Professor Bremer founded Cambridge College in 1971 when it was then known as the "Institute of Open Education" at Newton College of the Sacred Heart. After retirement he lived full-time in Vermont, where he continued his research and writing. He died on November 30, 2015.

John Bremer was born in England, living in London during The Blitz, and served in the Royal Air Force during World War II building airfields in England. He holds advanced degrees from the Pembroke College, Cambridge, England, the University of Leicester and St. John's College, U.S. Professor Bremer came to the US in 1951 on a Fulbright Fellowship.

In the 1960s Professor Bremer gained international recognition for creating the Parkway Program, in Philadelphia, the first School Without Walls as documented in a book by the same name. The school was featured in Time Magazine in its March 23, 1970 edition.

He was Killam Senior Fellow at Dalhousie University in Halifax and later Commissioner of Education for British Columbia, Canada in 1973.

In 1975, when a professor of Education at Western Washington University he founded the Institute of Socratic Study where Professor Bremer was its director until he moved to Australia in 1980 to found the Education Supplement for The Australian newspaper.

Bibliography
The School Without Walls: Philadelphia's Parkway Program, by John Bremer and Michael von Moschzisker, Holt, New York 1971  (trade) Also in translations as: Das Parkway-Program in Philadelphia: Schule ohne Mauern; as A Revolucao Pedagogica: Escola Sem Muros: a Program Parkway de Filadelfia; as La Escuela sin Paredos; and in a Japanese version
Open Education - A Beginning, by John Bremer and Anne Bremer, Holt, New York, 1972  (Trade) (translated as Educacion Abierta: Un Principio; as L'Ecole en Liberte: Guide du Maitre.)
On Educational Change, National Association of Elementary School Principals, Arlington 1973 
A Matrix for Modern Education, McClelland and Stewart, Toronto, 1975 
On Plato's Polity, Institute of Philosophy, Houston USA and Kalamunda WA, Australia, 1984 
Plato and the Founding of the Academy, University Press of America, 2002 
Plato's Ion: Philosophy as Performance, Bibal Press, Texas USA, January 2005, 
Thomas Taylor the Platonist and James Mill, Utilitarian
C.S. Lewis, Poetry, and the Great War 1914-1918 (fin press)
Homer's ILIAD (forthcoming)
Plato and the Founding of the Academy: Based on a Letter from Plato, newly discovered, University Press of America (November 8, 2002),

Notes and references

External links
The official site of John Bremer (Wayback Link - current site has no relation to Prof. Bremer)
3-23-1970 Time Magazine story on Parkway Program
Cambridge College website
Eric (US government web site) on Parkway Program
John Bremer listed in the Education Revolution "Hall of Fame"

Alumni of Pembroke College, Cambridge
Alumni of the University of Leicester
Classics educators
Academic staff of the Dalhousie University
St. John's College (Annapolis/Santa Fe) alumni
Western Washington University faculty
1927 births
2015 deaths